|}

The Winter Bumper is a Listed National Hunt flat race in Great Britain which is open to horses aged four to six years. It is run at Newbury over a distance of about 2 miles and  furlong (2 miles and 69 yards, or 3,282 metres), and it is scheduled to take place each year in February.

The first version of the race was established in 1996, and it was given Grade 2 status in 2002. The present title was introduced ahead of the planned running in 2009, but this race was cancelled because of snow. Prior to this it was known by various titles, usually the name of a sponsor appended with "Standard Open National Hunt Flat Race". The 2018 running was sponsored by Betfair.

The event serves as a trial for the Champion Bumper in March, although no horse has ever achieved victory in both races. However, the winner of the latter event in 1999, Monsignor, had earlier finished fourth in this race.

Records
<div style="font-size:90%">
Leading jockey (3 wins):
 Tony McCoy – Golden Alpha (1999), Crocodiles Rock (2007), Shutthefrontdoor (2012) 

Leading trainer (3 wins):
 Jonjo O'Neill – Iris's Gift (2002), Crocodiles Rock (2007), Shutthefrontdoor (2012)  
 Nicky Henderson -  Mad Max (2008), Ericht (2011), Daphne Du Clos (2017)

</div>

Winners

See also
 Horse racing in Great Britain
 List of British National Hunt races

References
 Racing Post:

 pedigreequery.com – Tote Standard Open NH Flat Race – Newbury.''

National Hunt races in Great Britain
Newbury Racecourse
National Hunt flat races
Recurring sporting events established in 1996
1996 establishments in England